Gul Rehmat (born 1934) is a Pakistani boxer. He competed in the men's light welterweight event at the 1956 Summer Olympics.

References

1934 births
Living people
Pakistani male boxers
Olympic boxers of Pakistan
Boxers at the 1956 Summer Olympics
Place of birth missing (living people)
Light-welterweight boxers